The Knudsen pump also referred to as "thermal transpiration pump" or "Knudsen compressor" is a gas pump that utilizes no moving parts. Instead it uses thermal transpiration, the phenomenon that gas molecules drift from the hot end to the cold end of a narrow channel. Thus a hot vacuum chamber "transpires" into the cold chamber. This thermal transpiration flow is induced when the boundary walls of the pump have a temperature gradient. Because the pump is based simply on temperature differences and has no moving parts, it could provide reliable and precise control of gas flow for a variety of applications, such as gas-sensing breath analyzers, chemical weapons detectors, and in satellite control.
It is named after Martin Knudsen, a Danish physicist.

References

Pumps